Sarah Biscarra-Dilley (born 1986) is a Native American interdisciplinary artist, curator, and writer from the Northern Chumash Tribe. Much of Biscarra-Dilley's work brings focus to sexuality and gender identity, as well as racial and cultural marginalization. These themes can be found throughout all of her work, whether it be in isolation or concurrently. Her works focus on the resiliency, self-determination, and sovereignty of Indigenous populations through the collaboration and shared experiences between communities, specifically within nitspu tiłhin ktitʸu, the State of California.

Biscarra-Dilley is known for her artwork within the collective art group, Black Salt Collective.

Early life and education 
Sarah Biscarra-Dilley was born in 1986 in the Central Valley in California. She is of the yak titʸu titʸu yak tiłhini Northern Chumash Tribe which resides in the homeland of the Chochenyo Ohlone people in unceded Nisenan land, also known as the Oakland, California area.

She was formally a high school dropout. Biscarra-Dilley attended the Institute of American Indian Arts (AIA), and received an undergraduate degree in 2011. She later went on to obtain a B.A. degree in Urban Studies at the San Francisco Art Institute in 2015. In 2018, Biscarra-Dilley earned a M.A. degree in Native American Studies from University of California, Davis where she is currently working on a PhD degree in Native American Studies.

Career 
Biscarra-Dilley is a part of the LGBTQ+ community and continues to incorporate this into her work, "The mixed-heritage, lesbian daughter of a strong-willed Mexican and Native American mother and an out, HIV-positive father, she has had the distinct benefit of being raised by inter-generational networks of blood and chosen/LGBTQ family; something to which she attributes many of her skills." Biscarra-Dilley's connection to the LGBTQ+ community is shown in her participation in projects such as the group exhibit at the Toronto Free Gallery called the Emnowaangosjig – Coming Out: The Shifting and Multiple Self  and the National Queer Arts Festival for numerous years.

In 2015, Biscarra-Dilley served as an intern at the California Consortium for Urban Indian Health working on "The Red Women Rising Project". This project that was funded by the Blue Shield of California Foundation, supports culturally responsive domestic violence services for urban Indians by increasing public awareness and enhancing collaborations between urban Indian health organizations, domestic violence support providers and traditional healers."

As of 2016, Biscarra-Dilley is working on writing a book that is focused on her Chumash heritage, in which “she hopes to bring all the parts, even the ugly ones, into the light to set the stage for healing. She is self-taught in two dialects of the Chumash language and continues to strengthen ties to her Indigenous community by studying the Chumash language independently and in collaboration with others doing the same.

Biscarra-Dilley often uses "cut paper, archival material, handwork, language, thread, found objects and various natural materials" within her artwork.

Biscarra-Dilley is a curator of her own work and contributes with other artists in curatorial projects. She completed various artist-in-residence programs such as the Art Writer's Tiny Residency in Portland, Oregon; the Indigenous Art Journal at the Banff Centre for Arts in Banff, Canada; and Creativity, Carrizozo Colony, Carrizozo, New Mexico, as well as multiple others. Biscarra-Dilley has been awarded numerous grants and funds for her work such as the Alternative Exposure grant (2013), the Point Foundation Scholarship (2012–2014), and the Art Matters Foundation grant (2016–2017).

Institute of Modern Art in Brisbane in 2018 invited Biscarra-Dilley, among four other Indigenous curators including Leuli Luna’i Eshraghi, Freja Carmichael, Tarah Hogue, and Lana Lopesi, “to develop [The Commute] a series of exhibitions and programs in collaboration with indigenous artists.”

The Facebook, Inc. headquarters in Menlo Park, California features mural work in a dining hall by Sarah Biscarra-Dilley and the Black Salt Collective.

Exhibitions 

Biscarra-Dilley has created several pieces with different mediums, has participated in many curatorial projects and exhibits, and has written for various publications.

 2018: tʸiptukɨłhɨwatʸiptutʸɨʔnɨ, video collage (still). Part of The Ethical Etherealness of Fuck and Love exhibit in La Centrale Galerie Powerhouse, Montreal, Quebec, Canada.
 2016: sup, sup, sup, sup (land, ground, year, dirt). Part of the Visions into Infinite Archives exhibit, curated by Black Salt Collective, SOMArts Gallery and Cultural Center, San Francisco, California.
 2016: CHRONOTOPIA: The Past, Present and Future of Queer Histories, SOMArts Gallery and Cultural Center, San Francisco, California.
2010: Ramona, 2007, mixed media. CHRONOTOPIA: The Past, Present and Future of Queer Histories, SOMArts Gallery and Cultural Center, San Francisco, California.

References

1986 births
University of California, Davis alumni
San Francisco Art Institute alumni
Institute of American Indian Arts alumni
Artists from San Francisco
Native American artists
Native American curators
LGBT Native Americans
Living people
American women curators
American curators
21st-century Native American women
21st-century Native Americans